Matilda Rose "Tilly" Walnes (born January 1980) is an English fashion designer, author and educator. Based in South London, she designs plain language sewing patterns and hosts online workshops. 

Walnes studied at the London College of Fashion after taking and enjoying an introduction to sewing class. Inspired by late 1960s fashion and the French New Wave, she began sewing her own clothes in 2010 and launched Tilly and the Buttons as a way to share her makes and connect with other sewers. 

The success of the blog resulted in a career change so that she could focus full-time on dressmaking, pattern design and sewing related teaching and writing, putting to use more than a decade of experience designing educational resources. She was motivated to create sewing resources that prioritize visual, plain language instructions after finding that the books she relied on while learning how to sew often relied on hard to follow jargon. 

In 2013, Walnes appeared on the first series of The Great British Sewing Bee. She was eliminated during the second week after struggling with a self-drafted trouser pattern. Walnes identified the garments she made on the show as some of the hardest she's done in a 2014 interview with PatternReview.com explaining: "On the show, you are working to a tight deadline, under hot lights, while being interviewed by camera crews the whole time. It's so easy to forget the basics and mess things up under that kind of pressure!"  

Walnes' work has been recognized multiple times by Sew Magazine's British Sewing Awards, including Best Sewing Blog and Favourite Sewing Personality. In 2018 she discussed her career, personal style and balancing a business as a new mother on the Canadian podcast Love To Sew.

Books

Make it Simple: Easy, Speedy Sewing Projects to Whip up in an Afternoon. 2020.

References

Living people
1980 births
People from Poole
Fashion educators 
English fashion designers
British women fashion designers
Alumni of the London College of Fashion